Monseñor Héctor Morera Vega (20 February 1926 – 23 December 2017) was a Catholic bishop.

Morera Vega was ordained to the priesthood in 1949. He served as bishop of the Diocese of Tilaran, Costa Rica from 1979 to 2002. He died on 23 December 2017, aged 91.

Notes

1926 births
2017 deaths
20th-century Roman Catholic bishops in Costa Rica
21st-century Roman Catholic bishops in Costa Rica
Roman Catholic bishops of Tilarán-Liberia